The Women's +75 kg weightlifting event at the 2007 All-Africa Games were held in Algiers, Algeria on 19 July 2007.

Records
Prior to this competition, the existing world, Commonwealth and Games records were as follows:

The following records were established during the competition:

Schedule
All times are West Africa Time (UTC+1)

Results

References

2007 All-Africa Games
Weightlifting at the African Games
2007 in weightlifting